The Premio Lo Nuestro 2018 was the thirtieth edition of "Lo Nuestro Awards", held on February 22, 2018 at the American Airlines Arena in Miami, Florida; and was broadcast live on Univision. The presenters were Laura Pausini, Lili Estefan and Alejandra Espinoza, being the first time that the presenters are all women.

The ceremony started with a review of the three decades of musical history

Description
The 30th edition of "Premio Lo Nuestro" was a great tribute to the Latin rhythms of the last three decades. Its protagonists did not disappoint on stage and relived their unforgettable successes also presenting new ones as a clear confirmation of the lasting Hispanic contribution to the musical sphere.

Performers
Below is the list of the live performances of the artists and the songs they performed:

Special awards

Acknowledgments 
 Olga Tañón (Artists with the most awards received: 30)
  Pitbull (Tribute to musical career)
 Wisin & Yandel (Tribute to musical career)

Lo Nuestro Award for Excellence 
  Emilio and Gloria Estefan

Artist of the year trajectory 
 Alejandro Fernández

References

2018 music awards
Lo Nuestro Awards by year
2018 in Florida
2018 in Latin music
2010s in Miami